The Savannah State Tigers football team represents Savannah State University in college football. The Tigers are members of the Southern Intercollegiate Athletic Conference (SIAC). The football team is traditionally the most popular sport at Savannah State and home games are played at Ted A. Wright Stadium in Savannah, Georgia.

After moving to the NCAA Division I FCS in 2000, the Tigers compiled a record of 80–137. While in the FCS, the team competed in the Mid-Eastern Athletic Conference. In 2019, the Tigers moved back to NCAA Division II and rejoined the SIAC. Savannah State has played football since 1902, though they did not field a team in 1943 to 1945. Through the 2018 season, the Tigers have compiled an all-time record of 491–567–18 (.465).

The program's largest margin of victory was 87 points in an 87–0 victory over Miles College in 1992. The largest margin of defeat was 98 points against Bethune-Cookman College in 1953 (Bethune-Cookman 98, Savannah State 0). Prior to a game against the Florida State Seminoles in 2012, the Seminoles were installed as 70.5 point favorites, reportedly making Savannah State the biggest underdogs in any college football game ever.

The team regularly participates in one or more black football classics each season, including the CSRA Football Classic and the Joe Turner Classic. The team has previously participated in the Gateway Classic, the Miami Classic, the Palmetto Capital City Classic, and the Circle City Classic.

Conference affiliations

No team:  1916–1922, 1924, 1943–1945

On September 8, 2010, Savannah State University was confirmed as a full member of the Mid-Eastern Athletic Conference (MEAC), making the Tigers eligible to participate in all conference championships and earn the conference's automatic berth to NCAA postseason competition in all sponsored sports.

Conference championships and NCAA playoff appearances
The Tigers were Southeastern Athletic Conference champions in 1938, 1948, 1950, and 1956.
The team's only NCAA playoff appearance occurred in 1992. The Tigers, led by Head Coach Bill Davis, were defeated by Jacksonville State University in the first round of the NCAA Division II playoffs, 41-16.

Season-by-season records
   NCAA I-AA MEAC    NCAA I-AA Independent    SIAC (NCAA Division II)   NCAA Division III    NAIA Southeastern

Notable players and coaches 
Some notable Savannah State football players and coaches include:

References

External links
 

 
1902 establishments in Georgia (U.S. state)
American football teams established in 1902